The 2016 Rajya Sabha elections were held as part of a routine six-year cycle among certain of the State Legislatures in India on March 14 and June 11, 2016, to elect 13 and 57 of its 245 members, of which the states through their legislators elect 233, and the remaining 12 are appointed by the President.  Being even-numbered, 2016 was a year in which about 30% of the State Legislature-elected 233-seat component of the body is elected.

There were also two by-elections, which are held if the incumbent resigns, dies, or is otherwise disqualified from serving.

March elections
The election of March 14, 2016 was held to elect 13 members for duration of 6 years from 6 states to the Rajya Sabha. The seats in following states were up for election with terms of sitting members ending as: Assam - 2 seats,  Himachal Pradesh - 1 seat,  Kerala - 3 seats,  Tripura - 1 seat all term ending on 2 April 201; Nagaland - 1 seat with term ending on 2 April 2016 but vacant since 26 November 2015 and Punjab - 5 seats with term ending on 9 April 2016.

Assam

Himachal Pradesh

Kerala

Nagaland

Tripura

Punjab

June elections
The election of June 11, 2016 was held to elect 57 members from 15 states to the Rajya Sabha. The seats in following states were up for election:

Andhra Pradesh

Bihar

Chhattisgarh

Haryana

Jharkhand

Karnataka

Madhya Pradesh

Maharashtra

Odisha

Punjab

Rajasthan

Tamil Nadu

Telangana

Uttar Pradesh

Uttarakhand

Bye elections

Gujarat
 A bye election was held on June 11, to fill the vacancy caused by death of Praveen Rashtrapal, who represented Gujarat. Parsottambhai Rupala was elected unopposed on June 3, for the vacancy with the term till 2 April 2018.

Madhya Pradesh
 Najma Heptullah, who represented Madhya Pradesh, and resigned after being appointed Governor of Manipur. La Ganesan was elected in this bye-election unopposed on October 6, with the term till 2 April 2018.

References

2016 elections in India
2016